The European Journal of Endocrinology is a monthly peer-reviewed medical journal covering endocrinology with a focus on clinical and translational studies, research, and reviews in paediatric and adult endocrinology. It is the clinical journal of the European Society of Endocrinology. The editor-in-chief is Wiebke Arlt (University of Birmingham). The journal has been published by Bioscientifica since 1999.

History
The journal was established in 1948 as Acta Endocrinologica by a group of Scandinavian endocrinologists. The founding editor-in-chief was Axel Westman. The journal was originally sponsored by the national endocrine societies of Denmark, Finland, Germany, the Netherlands, Norway, Sweden and Switzerland. Over its first four years the journal increased its publication frequency from four issues per year to nine issues; it has been published monthly since 1952.

The editors-in-chief between 1948 and 1994 were Axel Westman, Christian Hamburger, Jörgen Starup, and Christian Binder. Albert G. Burger was the first editor-in-chief under the new name.
In 1993 the journal became an official journal of the European Federation of Endocrine Societies (now European Society of Endocrinology). As part of this shift, the journal changed to its current name.
Having had a broad scope covering both basic and clinical endocrine research since its foundation in 1948, the journal's editorial board announced in 2008 that it would no longer publish basic research but focus on translational and clinical endocrinology. This decision was made to establish the journal as the clinical and translational journal of the European Society of Endocrinology, complementing the Society's other official journals (Journal of Endocrinology, Journal of Molecular Endocrinology and Endocrine-Related Cancer).

Editorial and review content is free to access from publication. Research articles become available for open access after 12 months (delayed open access). In addition, authors can pay an article processing charge upon acceptance to have their article made freely available online immediately upon publication (hybrid open access).

Abstracting and indexing
The journal is abstracted and indexed in:

According to the Journal Citation Reports, the journal has a 2020 impact factor of 6.664.

References

External links

Endocrinology journals
Publications established in 1948
Monthly journals
English-language journals
Academic journals associated with international learned and professional societies of Europe
Bioscientifica academic journals
Delayed open access journals
Hybrid open access journals